Beroroha is a municipality in Atsimo-Andrefana Region, Madagascar. Made up of 17 villages, the commune has a total population of 17,000. The area was severely affected by the 2009 passage of Cyclone Fanele. 

Beroroha lies on the Mangoky river, which is fast flowing, and can vary between 5 m and 500 m wide. The road from Ranohira (National road 15) is unpaved and only possible with 4x4 and normally takes two days from Antananarivo. An airport serves the town.

Nature
The Makay Massif lies partly in Beroroha.

References

Populated places in Atsimo-Andrefana